James George Crisp (15 November 1927 – 4 December 2005) was a Welsh first-class cricketer.

Crisp was born at Newtown in November 1927. While studying at Worcester College at the University of Oxford, he made a single appearance in first-class cricket for Oxford University against Leicestershire at Oxford in 1951. Batting twice in the match, he ended the Oxford first-innings unbeaten without scoring, while in their second-innings he was dismissed for 12 runs by Vic Jackson. He also bowled ten wicketless overs in the Oxford first-innings, conceding 26 runs. He also played football for Oxford University A.F.C., gaining a blue. In addition to playing first-class cricket, Crisp also played minor counties cricket for Suffolk in 1957 and 1958, making three appearances in the Minor Counties Championship. He died in December 2005 at Butleigh, Somerset.

References

External links

1927 births
2005 deaths
People from Newtown, Powys
Sportspeople from Powys
Alumni of Worcester College, Oxford
Welsh cricketers
Oxford University cricketers
Oxford University A.F.C. players
Suffolk cricketers
Welsh footballers
Association footballers not categorized by position